Blackball is a small town on the West Coast of the South Island of New Zealand, approximately 29 km from Greymouth. Elevation is approximately 100 metres. The town was named after the Black Ball Shipping Line, which leased land in the area to mine for coal.

Blackball was a centre of New Zealand radicalism and workers' militancy. It is credited as the birthplace of (the predecessors of) the New Zealand Labour Party, which followed the 1908 miners 'cribtime' strike, at ten weeks the longest in New Zealand history. In the 1913 Great Strike, Blackball miners were the last to return to work, in 1914. During the strike they had picketed miners in nearby Brunner and had burnt down the secretary of the 'arbitration' (scab) union's home. In 1925 the headquarters of the Communist Party of New Zealand moved to Blackball from Wellington. The pit closed in 1964.

History

The gold rush in the Moonlight district in 1864-65 heralded the birth of Blackball. In November 1865 a gold nugget was found in what was later called Blackball Creek but it was not until 1866 that gold in payable quantities was found in upper Blackball Creek. At the time, this area was known as Garden Gully but as gold continued to be found, it became known as Croesus.

As the number of gold miners continued to increase, the difficulties of supplying them with food multiplied. The Plateau (later to be known as Blackball) was used as an over-night stop in the two-day journey from Greymouth. Huts and small store sheds gradually formed a small township which became known as Blackball.

Blackball Workingmen's Club is one of the few old community organisations left in the town. Both the Oddfellows Lodge and the Buffaloes Lodge closed long ago. In its heyday Blackball had a Lodge of the Oddfellows Order. The Oddfellows Lodge played a major role in community life offering financial aid and self-improvement in the age before TV and State Social Security. The Oddfellows Hall was a major center of community activity and social life.

The Blackball lodge of the United Ancient Order of Druids was formed originally in 1906 and like most other organisations of its day has ceased to exist in Blackball. While most businesses and organisations have shut down in the town of Blackball, the hotel once named "The Blackball Hilton" was stil operating in 2021. Though now known as "Formerly the Blackball Hilton" due to a lawsuit by the Hilton hotel chain, the historic hotel remains in business as a place to sleep and is a symbol of the town's historic background.

On 7 June 1941 the Blackball Lodge No 80 of the Royal Antediluvian Order of Buffaloes was opened In the Oddfellows Lodge Hall by the Provincial Grand Primo of the West Coast Bro. T.J.Preston KoM. The founders of the lodge were Bro. T.Durkin C.P. and Bro. T Nicolson C.P.  both of whom would cycle 35 miles every fortnight just to attend lodge meetings of Blackball Lodge and thus fulfill their duties as Founders.  The first officers of the Blackball Lodge No 80 were Bro. Durkin C.P.(Worthy Primo) Bro. Nicholson C.P. (Alderman of Benevolence) Bro. R. Cooke (City Chamberlain) Bro. J Moore (City Marshall) Bro. Reid (City Tyler) Bro. R Duggan (City Registrar) Bro. R Mountford (City Constable) Bro. A Ross (City Waiter) Bro. Johnston (City Minstrel) Bro. J Barry (City Treasurer) and Bro. M O'Flaherty (City Secretary)

Demographics

The population of Blackball was 276 in the 2018 census, a decrease of 2 from 2013, and a decrease of 39 from 2006. There were 150 males and 126 females. 258 people (93.5%) identified as European/Pākehā, 30 (10.9%) as Māori, 3 (1.1%) as Pacific peoples, and 6 (2.2%) as Asian. 33 (12.%) were under 15 years old, 42 (15.2%) were 15–29, 156 (56.5%) were 30–64, and 51 (18.5%) were over 65.

Railway 

Blackball was the terminus of the New Zealand Railways Department's Blackball Branch, a branch line from the Stillwater–Westport Line.  The line was approved in 1901, construction began in 1902 under the auspices of the Public Works Department, trains first ran in 1909, and it was officially opened on 1 August 1910.  Private interests constructed a steep extension from Blackball into the Paparoa Ranges that employed the Fell mountain railway system to aid braking.  This extension was later taken over by the State Mines Department and was known as the Roa Incline.

Passenger services operated to Blackball until 1940, primarily for the benefit of miners.  Coal was the mainstay of the railway, and when tonnages dropped to an unsustainable level the Roa Incline closed on 25 July 1960.  Trains to Blackball became increasingly infrequent, and when a flood destroyed two spans of the line's bridge over the Grey River on 21 February 1966, the Railways Department viewed repairs as unjustifiably expensive and closed the line.  Blackball's station building had been destroyed by fire in 1955.

Restaurants, museums and recreation
The Blackball Museum of Working Class History opened in the town on 1 May 2010, in order to "celebrate the role working people have played in creating the infrastructure and wealth of a nation, [and] the part working people have played in creating society".

The "Formerly the Blackball Hilton" hotel was founded in 1910 as the "Dominion Hotel", but in the 1970s renamed itself "Blackball Hilton" after the mine manager (after whom the town's main street, Hilton Street, is also named).  The hotel changed its name after objections from the international hotel chain Hilton Hotels & Resorts.

An annual cycle race, the Blackball Working Men's Cycling Classic, was held in the town in January for three years: 2010–12. Cyclists raced between Blackball and the nearby settlement of Atarau (Moonlight).

Literature 

Blackball has a unique literary inheritance: for a small town, it has managed to attract more than its share of literary representations. Bill Pearson's Coal Flat (1963) is a major New Zealand novel in the dated social realist tradition. Pearson had taught in the town as a probationary teacher in 1942, and had formed a friendship with the publican's family. His book caused some consternation amongst the local people, as they tried to "spot the character" and identify who Pearson had based his characters on  Pearson died in 2002.

Eric Beardsley's Blackball '08 is an historical novel published in 1984. Beardsley used the historic 1908 Crib Time strike as the basis for a story that fleshed out the drama of what was a key moment in New Zealand trade union history. He published his biography Sliding down the Hypotenuse in 2011.

Jeffrey Paparoa Holman wrote The Late Great Blackball Bridge Sonnets, a collection of poetry published in 2004, which contains poems based around the railway bridge that linked the community with the outside world. The poems also mention people and features of the town, which Holman recalls from his childhood in Blackball during the 1950s and 1960s.

Paul Maunder, who lives in the town, is a playwright who has written and staged a number of plays about the town and working-class history.

Stevan Eldred-Grigg, who spent the first six years of his life in the town and now lives there once more, is a novelist and historian who has recently published a memoir about family life in 1950s Blackball.

References

Bibliography

 Historical Novel

External links

Formerly The Blackball Hilton Hotel
Recollections of visiting Blackball in the early 1960s by Jim Hopkins

Grey District
Populated places in the West Coast, New Zealand